The Sultanate of Bulungan (کسلطانن بولوڠن) was a princely state of Indonesia located in the existing Bulungan Regency in the North Kalimantan province of Indonesia in the east of the island of Borneo. Its territory spanned the eastern shores of North Kalimantan and Tawau, Malaysia.

Pre-establishment 

Until 1860, Bulungan was a subject of the Sulu. During this period, vessels began travelling to Sulu, Tarakan, and thence into the interior of Bulungan, to trade directly with Tidung.
It was because of territorial acquisition like this that Sulu became a sultanate in her own right.
Allegedly, this influence ended in 1878 with the signing of a treaty between the English and Spanish, partitioning Sulu.

Foundations 
The Sultanate was founded by a Kayan group, the Uma Apan, who originated from the interior region of Apo Kayan (Kayan Highland Plateau), before settling near the coast in the 17th century. Around 1650, a princess of the group married a man from Brunei. This marriage founded a Hindu lineage who settled in the region of today's Tanjung Selor. Around 1750, this dynasty converted to Islam. Its rulers took the title of Sultan and were recognised as vassals of the sultan of Berau, the latter acknowledging himself a vassal of the kingdom of Kutai.

In 1850, the Dutch, who had conquered Berau in 1834 and imposed their sovereignty upon Kutai in 1848, signed with the Sultan of Bulungan a Politiek Contract. The Dutch intervened in the region to combat piracy and the trafficking in slaves.

Foreign intervention 
In 1881, the North Borneo Chartered Company was created, thereby placing northern Borneo under British jurisdiction, despite initial Dutch objections. The Sultanate was finally incorporated into the colonial empire of the Dutch East Indies in the 1880s. The Dutch installed a government post in 1893 in Tanjung Selor. In the 20th century, like many other princely states of the archipelago, the Sultan was forced to sign a Korte verklaring; a "short statement" in which he sold most of its powers over land upstream.

The Dutch eventually recognised the border between the two jurisdictions in 1915. The Sultanate was granted Zelfbestuur ("self-administration") status in 1928, again like many princely states of the Netherlands Indies.

The discovery of oil by the BPM (Bataafse Petroleum Maatschappij) in the islands of Bunyu and Tarakan gave great importance to Bulungan for the Dutch, who made Tarakan the chief town of the region.

Post-Indonesian independence 
After the recognition of Indonesian independence from the Kingdom of the Netherlands, the territory received the status of Bulungan Wilayah swapraja, or "autonomous territory", in 1950, before receiving the status of Wilayah istimewa, or "special territory", in 1955. The last Sultan, Jalaluddin, died in 1958. The Sultanate was abolished in 1959 and the territory becomes a simple kabupaten, or "department".

On the dawn of Friday, 3 July 1964, a troop of Brawijaya 517 soldiers led by Lieutnant B Simatupang under the orders of Brigadier General Suharjo quickly swooped in the Bulungan Palace, kidnapping its aristocrat inhabitants while burning the rest of the palace grounds which lasted for 2 days and nights on Friday 24 July 1964. The kidnapees were later murdered, one Raja Muda Datu Mukemat in particular was reported to have been brought to sea between the islands of Tarakan and Bunyu, where he was shackled with stones as weight, shot dead and cast out into the sea.

Gallery

References

Sources
 Burhan Magenda, East Kalimantan: the decline of a commercial aristocracy, Cornell Modern Indonesia Project, 1991, 
 Sellato, Bernard, Forest, Resources and People in Bulungan, Center for International Forestry Research, 2001, 

Former countries in Borneo
Precolonial states of Indonesia
Islamic states in Indonesia
Former countries in Malaysian history
Former sultanates
States and territories disestablished in 1964
States and territories established in 1731